Alipurduar is a city and a municipality in the Indian state of West Bengal. It is the headquarters of the Alipurduar district. Situated on the east bank of Kaljani River on the foothills of the Himalayas, the city is a gateway to Bhutan and northeastern states of India. Alipurduar was a sub-divisional town of Jalpaiguri district until 2007 when it was created a separate district.

Geography

Location

Area overview
Alipurduar district is covered by two maps. It is an extensive area in the eastern end of the Dooars in West Bengal. It is undulating country, largely forested, with numerous rivers flowing down from the outer ranges of the Himalayas in Bhutan. It is a predominantly rural area with 79.38% of the population living in the rural areas. The district has 1 municipal town and 20 census towns and that means that 20.62% of the population lives in the urban areas. The scheduled castes and scheduled tribes, taken together, form more than half the population in all the six community development blocks in the district. There is a high concentration of tribal people (scheduled tribes) in the three northern blocks of the district.

Demographics

In the 2011 census, Alipurduar Urban Agglomeration had a population of 127,342, out of which 64,898 were males and 62,444 were females. The 0–6 years population was 10,545. Effective literacy rate for the 7+ population was 89.16 per cent.

 census, Alipurduar had a population of 73,047. Males constitute 51% of the population and females 49%. Alipurduar has an average literacy rate of 78%, higher than the national average of 59.5%; with 54% of the males and 46% of females literate. 10% of the population is under 6 years of age.

Municipality

Education

Schools 
 Jasodanga High School (HS)
 St. Joseph's High School
 Little Flowers English School
 Railway Higher Secondary School
 Stepping Stone Model School
 Techno India Group Public School
 M. C. William Higher Secondary School
 Alipurduar High School
 Alipurduar Girls' High School
 Alipurduar Newtown Girls' High School
 Kendriya Vidyalaya
 St. Xavier's School
Jitpur Higher Secondary School
 Shyamaprsad Vidyamandir Boys & Girls
 Alipurduar Gobinda High School
 Rabikanta High School
 Majidkhana High School (H.S)

Colleges 
 Alipurduar University
 Alipurduar Mahila Mahavidyalaya (affiliated with University of North Bengal)
 Vivekananda College, Alipurduar (affiliated with University of North Bengal)
 Industrial Training Institute (ITI), Birpara
 Nani Bhattacharya Smarak Mahavidyalaya, Jaigaon
 Birpara College, Birpara
  Alipurduar govt. polytechnic college,Alipurduar
 Alipurduar govt. Engineering college,  Under construction 
 Falakata College, Falakata
 Sahid Kshudiram Mahavidyalaya, Uttar Kamakhyaguri
 Samuktala Sidhu Kanhu College
 Falakata Polytechnic
 Lilabati Mahavidyalaya
 Pijushkanti Mukherjee Mahavidyalaya

Institute 
 Industrial Training Institute

Note: The map presents some of the notable locations in the subdivision. All places marked in the map are linked in the larger full screen map.

See also 
 Alipurduars (Lok Sabha constituency)
 Alipurduar district

References

External links
 Official website of Alipurduar Municipality
 Official website of Alipurduar district
 

Cities and towns in Alipurduar district
Cities in West Bengal